Long underwear, also called long johns or thermal underwear, is a style of two-piece underwear with long legs and long sleeves that is normally worn during cold weather.  It is commonly worn by people under their clothes in cold countries.

In the United States, it is usually made from a cotton or cotton-polyester-blend fabric with a waffle weave texture, although some varieties are also made from flannel, particularly the union suit, while many newer varieties are made from polyester, such as the Capilene trade name.

European manufacturers use wool blends or even 100% wool, usually Merino or other high-quality wool. Some models might include a thin layer of polyester to transport moisture away from the skin. Wool, in addition to being fire retardant, provides highly effective insulation and will keep its insulating properties even when wet, as opposed to cotton. 
 
The type known as "thermal underwear" is made from two-ply fabric of either a wool layer and an artificial fibre, only wool or – again mostly in the U.S. – two layers of only artificial fibres, which uses trapped body heat to insulate against cold air.

Etymology of long johns
The manufacturing foundations of long johns may lie in Derbyshire, England, at John Smedley's Lea Mills, located in Matlock. The company has a 225-year heritage and is said to have created the garment, reputedly named after the late-19th-century heavyweight boxer John L. Sullivan; the company still produces long johns. 

In 2004, Michael Quinion, a British etymologist and writer, postulated that the john in the item of apparel may be a reference to Sullivan, who wore a similar-looking garment in the ring. This explanation, however, is uncertain and the term's origin is ultimately unknown. 

It has also been posed that the term is an approximation of the French , which translates to 'long legs.'

History of long johns
Long johns were first introduced into England in the 17th century, but they did not become popular as sleepwear until the 18th century. They were first used as loungewear but then later became popular in Truro, Nova Scotia. In 1898, Myles and his brother John had developed a product called Stanfield's Unshrinkable Underwear for their garment manufacturing company.

Long johns first appeared in North America when Frank Stanfield, a Canadian, applied for the first patent for the long johns design. He and his brother started with non-shrinking cotton underwear and formally applied for a patent for long johns on December 7, 1915, becoming the pioneer of long johns.

After 1918, countries returned to producing more and more daily usages. The Industrial Revolution progressed in accordance with the concept of the assembly line and division of labor. Manual laborers who were physically active were divided into laborers who performed more upper-body activity and laborers with more lower-body activity.

In 1940, the United States did not have today's indoor heating solutions; many people used stoves to heat rooms in winter. At that time, one not only had to wear long underwear or the union suit but also a nightcap when going to bed, and the frequency of bathing was far less than the current time.

During the US-Soviet Kitchen Debate in 1959, Khrushchev questioned the technological level of Nixon's "typical American housing" – judging from the historical reference to long pants, the appliances displayed in the United States may have been more advanced.

Long underwear in other countries

China 
In China, people use separate words to refer to the two parts of long underwear, and the terms vary across the country. People living south of the Yangtze River call the top  and the bottom .

In the early 2010s, a myth spread through Chinese social media that long underwear was part of the Soviet Union's conspiracy to prevent Chinese military powers from invading Soviet soil in the far east. The myth suggested that the Soviet Union believes that long underwear reduces Chinese soldiers' adaptability in cold climates based on the since-debunked theory of Lysenkoism popular in the mid-20th century.

References

External links 

17th-century fashion
18th-century fashion
19th-century fashion
Undergarments
Winter clothes